Tenohira wo Taiyou ni / Delighted (手のひらを太陽に / Palm to the Sun) is the seventh domestic single by Japanese hip hop group Lead. The single charted in the top ten on the Oricon charts, coming in at #8, and remained on the charts for four weeks. 

Unlike their previous singles, which featured a limited edition CD+DVD combo, Tenohira wo Taiyou ni / Delighted was only released a standard CD.

Information
Tenohira wo Taiyou ni / Delighted is the seventh single released by Japanese hip-hop group Lead. The single peaked in the top ten on the Oricon Singles Charts at #8 and remained on the charts for four consecutive weeks. The limited editions of the single contained one of five possible trading cards, a URL that would take purchasers to site for a chance to win their live DVD Lead 1st Live Tour ~Brand New Era~ and for buyers to download a specialized wallpaper.

"Tenohira wo Taiyou ni" was a cover of the Japanese nursery rhyme of the same name written by Takashi Yanase in the 1960s. "Delighted" was used as the for the television show Deep Love ~Ayu no Monogatari~, which was an adaption of the cell phone novel Deep Love by Yoshi.

Despite being a double a-side, only "Tenohira wo Taiyou ni" received a music video. While the music video was released for syndication upon the single's release, it was not available for purchase until March 16, 2005 on their second compilation VHS/DVD Lead Movies 2 (stylized as Lead MOVIES2).

Promotional activities
The coupling track "Delighted" was used as the theme song for the television show Deep Love ~Ayu no Monogatari~ (アユの物語 / Story of Ayu). The show was a television adaption of the cell phone novel Deep Love by Yoshi and ran for twelve episodes from January 7, 2005 to March 25, 2005.

Keita had played Yoshiyuki in both the film Deep Love and the television show Deep Love ~Ayu no Monogatari~.

Track listing

Charts

References

External links
Lead Official Site

2004 singles
2004 songs
Pony Canyon singles
Lead (band) songs